is  the former Head coach of the Toyota Boshoku Sunshine Rabbits in the Women's Japan Basketball League. He played college basketball for Chukyo University.

Head coaching record

|- 
| style="text-align:left;"|Boshoku
| style="text-align:left;"|2004-05
| 12||1||11|||| style="text-align:center;"| 5th in W1|||-||-||-||
| style="text-align:center;"|-
|-
| style="text-align:left;"|Boshoku
| style="text-align:left;"|2005-06
| 16||4||12|||| style="text-align:center;"| 5th in W1|||-||-||-||
| style="text-align:center;"|-
|-
| style="text-align:left;"|Boshoku
| style="text-align:left;"|2006-07
| 16||2||14|||| style="text-align:center;"| 5th in W1|||-||-||-||
| style="text-align:center;"|-
|-
| style="text-align:left;"|Boshoku
| style="text-align:left;"|2007-08
| 16||8||8|||| style="text-align:center;"| 2nd in W1|||-||-||-||
| style="text-align:center;"|-
|-
| style="text-align:left;"|Boshoku
| style="text-align:left;"|2008-09
| 16||8||8|||| style="text-align:center;"| 2nd in W1|||-||-||-||
| style="text-align:center;"|-
|-
| style="text-align:left;"|Boshoku
| style="text-align:left;"|2009-10
| 16||10||6|||| style="text-align:center;"| 3rd in W1|||-||-||-||
| style="text-align:center;"|-
|-
| style="text-align:left;"|Boshoku
| style="text-align:left;"|2010-11
| 16||9||7|||| style="text-align:center;"| 2nd in W1|||-||-||-||
| style="text-align:center;"|-
|-
| style="text-align:left;"|Boshoku
| style="text-align:left;"|2011-12
| 16||14||2|||| style="text-align:center;"| 1st in W1|||-||-||-||
| style="text-align:center;"|-
|-

References

1968 births
Living people
Japanese women's basketball coaches